Breyten Breytenbach (born 16 September 1939) is a South African writer, poet, and painter who became internationally well-known as a dissident poet and vocal critic of South Africa under apartheid, and as a political prisoner of the National Party-led South African Government. Breytenbach is now informally considered by Afrikaans-speakers as their poet laureate and is one of the most important living poets in Afrikaans literature. He also holds French citizenship.

Biography
Breyten Breytenbach was born in Bonnievale, approximately 180 km from Cape Town and 100 km from the southernmost tip of Africa at Cape Agulhas. His early education was at Hoërskool Hugenote and he later studied fine arts at the Michaelis School of Fine Art at the University of Cape Town. 
He is the brother of Jan Breytenbach, co-founder of the 1st Reconnaissance Commando of the South African Special Forces against whom he holds strongly opposing political views, and the late Cloete Breytenbach, a widely published war correspondent.

His committed political dissent against the ruling National Party and its white supremacist policy of apartheid compelled him to leave South Africa for Paris, France, in the early 1960s, where he married a French woman of Vietnamese ancestry, Yolande, due to which he was not allowed to return. The then applicable Prohibition of Mixed Marriages Act of 1949 and Immorality Act (1950) made it a criminal offence for a person to have any sexual relations with a person of a different race. He is the father of the French journalist Daphnee Breytenbach.

Imprisonment
On an illegal trip to South Africa in 1975, he was arrested and sentenced to nine years' imprisonment for high treason. His work The True Confessions of an Albino Terrorist describes aspects of his imprisonment. According to André Brink, Breytenbach was retried in June 1977 on new and fanciful charges that, among other things, he had planned a submarine attack by the Soviet Navy on the prison at Robben Island through the conspiratorial "Okhela Organisation." In the end, the judge found him guilty only of having smuggled letters and poems out of jail for which he was fined $50.

During his imprisonment, Breytenbach wrote the poem, Ballade van ontroue bemindes ("Ballade of Unfaithful Lovers"). Inspired by François Villon's Ballade des Dames du Temps Jadis, Breytenbach compared Afrikaner dissidents Peter Blum, Ingrid Jonker, and himself to unfaithful lovers, who had betrayed Afrikaans poetry by taking leave of it.

Released in 1982 as a result of international protests, he returned to Paris and obtained French citizenship.

After free elections toppled the ruling National Party and ended apartheid in 1994, Breytenbach became a visiting professor at the University of Cape Town in the Graduate School of Humanities in January 2000 and is also involved with the Gorée Institute in Dakar (Senegal) and with New York University, where he teaches in the Graduate Creative Writing Program.

Works
Breytenbach's work includes numerous volumes of novels, poetry and essays, many of which are in Afrikaans. Many have been translated from Afrikaans to English, and many were originally published in English. He is also known for his works of pictorial arts. Exhibitions of his paintings and prints have been shown in cities around the world, including Johannesburg, Cape Town, Hong Kong, Amsterdam, Stockholm, Paris, Brussels, Edinburgh and New York City.

Awards
 Laureate of the Zbigniew Herbert International Literary Award 2017
 Ansfield-Wolf Book Award
 Allen Paton Award for Literature
 Mahmoud Darwish Award for Creativity

Bibliography

Poetry in Afrikaans
 The Iron Cow Must Sweat (Die ysterkoei moet sweet), Johannesburg, 1964
 The House of the Deaf (Die huis van die dowe), Cape Town, 1967
 Gangrene (Kouevuur), Cape Town, 1969
 Lotus, Cape Town, 1970
 The Remains (Oorblyfsels), Cape Town, 1970
 Scrit. Painting Blue a sinking Ship. (Skryt. Om 'n sinkende skip blou te verf), Amsterdam, 1972
 In Other Words (Met ander woorde), Cape Town, 1973
 Footnote (Voetskrif), Johannesburg, 1976
 Sinking Ship Blues, Oasis Editions, Toronto 1977
 And Death White as Words. An Anthology, London, 1978
 In Africa even the flies are happy, London, 1978
 Flower Writing (Blomskryf), Emmarentia, 1979 (Selected poems)
 Eclipse (Eklips), Emmarentia, 1983
 YK, Emmarentia, 1983
 Buffalo Bill, Emmarentia, 1984
 Living Death (Lewendood), Emmarentia, 1985
 Judas Eye, London – New York, 1988
 As Like (Soos die so), Emmarentia, 1990
 Nine Landscapes of our Times Bequeathed to a Beloved (Nege landskappe van ons tye bemaak aan 'n beminde), Groenkloof, 1993
 The Handful of Feathers (Die hand vol vere), Cape Town, 1995 (Selected poems)
 The Remains. An Elegy (Oorblyfsels. 'n Roudig), Cape Town, 1997
 Paper Flower (Papierblom), Cape Town, 1998
 Lady One, Cape Town, 2000 (Selected love poems)
 Iron Cow Blues (Ysterkoei-blues), Cape Town, 2001 (Collected poems 1964–1975)
 Lady One: Of Love and other Poems, New York, 2002
 The undanced dance. Prison poetry 1975 – 1983 (Die ongedanste dans. Gevangenisgedigte 1975 – 1983), Cape Town, 2005
 the windcatcher (Die windvanger), Cape Town, 2007
 Voice Over: A Nomadic Conversation with Mahmoud Darwish, Archipelago Books, 2009
 Catalects (Artefacts for the slow uses of dying) (Katalekte (artefakte vir die stadige gebruike van doodgaan)), Cape Town: Human & Rousseau, 2012

Prose in English
 Catastrophes (Katastrofes), Johannesburg, 1964 (stories)
 To Fly (Om te vlieg), Cape Town, 1971 (novel)
 The Tree Behind the Moon (De boom achter de maan), Amsterdam, 1974 (stories)
 The Anthill Bloats … (Die miernes swell op ...), Emmarentia, 1980 (stories)
 A Season in Paradise (Een seizoen in het paradijs), Amsterdam – New York – London, 1980 (novel, uncensored edition)
 Mouroir: Mirror Notes of a Novel, London – New York, 1983
 Mirror Death (Spiegeldood), Amsterdam, 1984 (stories)
 End Papers, London, 1985 (essays)
 The True Confessions of an Albino Terrorist, London – New York, 1985
 Memory of Snow and of Dust, London – New York, 1987 (novel)
 Book. Part One (Boek. Deel een), Emmarentia, 1987 (essays)
 All One Horse. Fiction and Images, London, 1989
 Sweet Heart (Hart-Lam), Emmarentia, 1991 (essays)
 Return to Paradise. An African journal, London – New York, 1992 (which won the Alan Paton Award)
 The Memory of Birds in Times of Revolution, London – New York, 1996 (essays)
 Dog Heart. A travel memoir, Cape Town, 1998
 Word Work (Woordwerk), Cape Town, 1999
 A veil of footsteps, Cape Town, 2008
 All One Horse, Archipelago Books, 2008
 Mouroir: Mirror Notes of a Novel, Archiepalago Books, 2008
 Intimate Stranger, Archipelago Books, 2009
 Notes From The Middle World: Essays, Haymarket Books, 2009

Articles

In popular culture
Breytenbach is the only exception mentioned by name in the satirical Apartheid-era Spitting Image song "I've Never Met a Nice South African".

The Basque rock band Berri Txarrak dedicated the song "Breyten" to him on their 2005 album "Jaio.Musika.Hil."

See also

 Sestigers
 Zbigniew Herbert International Literary Award

References

External links

A Conversation with South African Poet and Anti-Apartheid Activist Breyten Breytenbach on His Own Imprisonment, South Africa’s "Failed Revolution," Nelson Mandela and Barack Obama
An Hour with the Renowned South African Poet, Writer, Painter and Anti-Apartheid Activist Breyten Breytenbach
Podcast Interview with Breytenbach by André Naffis-Sahely
Review of Voice Over: A Nomadic Conversation with Mahmoud Darwish by André Naffis-Sahely
Stellenbosch Writers
Breyten Breytenbach, Professor of Creative Writing
Open letter to General Ariel Sharon (by Breyten Breytenbach)
http://www.goreeinstitut.org/
Poetry Podcast at Badilisha Poetry Exchange
Culture.pl interview from May 2017 after winning the Zbigniew Herbert International Literary Award

1939 births
Living people
People from Langeberg Local Municipality
Afrikaner people
South African people of German descent
South African poets
Sestigers
Academic staff of the University of Cape Town
Afrikaans-language writers
Michaelis School of Fine Art alumni
Afrikaans literature
Hertzog Prize winners for poetry
South African emigrants to France
French people of South African descent
White South African anti-apartheid activists
20th-century South African writers
21st-century South African writers
Afrikaner anti-apartheid activists
Afrikaans-language poets